National symbols of Switzerland are the symbols used to represent Switzerland. As of 2020 the Swiss legislature has made three Swiss national symbols official, a flag, coat of arms and anthem, but various other symbols are used as well to represent the Swiss people.

Official national symbols

Unofficial national symbols

Other Swiss symbols 
Switzerland currently does not have a national animal, but the animal most commonly associated with Switzerland, or Alpine culture in general, is the cow. However, various other animals have been used to represent the Swiss nation, such as the marmot, ibex, St. Bernhard and blackbird. There are, in addition, also a handful of cantons who use a certain animal as symbol. These include the bear, bull, ram, ibex, lion and eagle. Other popular Swiss symbols worth mentioning may include Swiss cheese, Swiss chocolate, Rösti and the Swiss Army knife.

References